Cantaracillo is a village and municipality in the province of Salamanca,  western Spain, part of the autonomous community of Castile and Leon.

The postal code is 37319.

References

Municipalities in the Province of Salamanca